The 2016 Italian Open (also known as the 2016 Rome Masters and sponsored title 2016 Internazionali BNL d'Italia) was a tennis tournament played on outdoor clay courts at the Foro Italico in Rome, Italy. It was the 73rd edition of the Italian Open and is classified as an ATP World Tour Masters 1000 event on the 2016 ATP World Tour and a Premier 5 event on the 2016 WTA Tour. It took place from 9 to 15 May 2016.

Points and prize money

Point distribution

Prize money

ATP main draw entrants

Singles

Seeds

Rankings are as of May 2, 2016.

Other entrants
The following players received wildcards into the main draw:
  Salvatore Caruso
  Marco Cecchinato
  Paolo Lorenzi
  Lorenzo Sonego

The following players received entry using a protected ranking into the main draw:
  Julien Benneteau
  Juan Mónaco

The following players received entry from the qualifying draw:
  Aljaž Bedene
  Íñigo Cervantes
  Damir Džumhur
  Ernests Gulbis
  Mikhail Kukushkin
  Stéphane Robert
  Filippo Volandri

The following player received entry as a lucky loser:
  Lucas Pouille

Withdrawals
Before the tournament
  Marcos Baghdatis →replaced by  Nicolas Mahut
  Marin Čilić →replaced by  Andreas Seppi
  Juan Martín del Potro →replaced by  Vasek Pospisil  
  Tommy Haas →replaced by  Borna Ćorić 
  John Isner →replaced by  Juan Mónaco
  Martin Kližan →replaced by  Teymuraz Gabashvili
  Gilles Simon →replaced by  Albert Ramos-Viñolas
  Jo-Wilfried Tsonga (muscle strain) →replaced by  Lucas Pouille

During the tournament
  Juan Mónaco

Retirements
  Bernard Tomic (influenza)

Doubles

Seeds

 Rankings are as of May 2, 2016.

Other entrants
The following pairs received wildcards into the doubles main draw:
  Andrea Arnaboldi /  Alessandro Giannessi
  Fabio Fognini /  Andreas Seppi

The following pair received entry as alternates:
  Dominic Inglot /  Fabrice Martin

Withdrawals
Before the tournament
  Pierre-Hugues Herbert (knee injury)

Retirements
  Kevin Anderson (muscle strain)

WTA main draw entrants

Singles

Seeds

Rankings are as of May 2, 2016.

Other entrants
The following players received wildcards into the main draw:
  Claudia Giovine
  Karin Knapp
  Francesca Schiavone

The following players received entry from the qualifying draw:
  Kiki Bertens
  Mariana Duque Mariño
  Julia Görges
  Johanna Larsson
  Christina McHale
  Monica Puig
  Alison Riske
  Heather Watson

Withdrawals
Before the tournament
  Belinda Bencic (lower back injury) → replaced by  Teliana Pereira
  Camila Giorgi (back injury) → replaced by  Caroline Garcia
  Sloane Stephens → replaced by  Tímea Babos
  Caroline Wozniacki (right ankle injury) → replaced by  Yanina Wickmayer

Doubles

Seeds

 Rankings are as of May 2, 2016.

Other entrants
The following pairs received wildcards into the doubles main draw:
  Claudia Giovine /  Angelica Moratelli
  Karin Knapp /  Francesca Schiavone
  Svetlana Kuznetsova /  Anastasia Pavlyuchenkova
  Serena Williams /  Venus Williams

Champions

Men's singles
 
  Andy Murray def.  Novak Djokovic, 6–3, 6–3

Women's singles
  
  Serena Williams def.  Madison Keys, 7–6(7–5), 6–3

Men's doubles
 
  Bob Bryan /  Mike Bryan def.  Vasek Pospisil /  Jack Sock, 2–6, 6–3, [10–7]

Women's doubles
  
  Martina Hingis /  Sania Mirza def.  Ekaterina Makarova /  Elena Vesnina, 6–1, 6–7(5–7), [10–3]

References

External links
Official website